Reggie Taylor (born February 8, 1964 in Los Angeles, California) was a Canadian Football League running back for the BC Lions and for the Edmonton Eskimos from 1988 through 1991. He was an All-Star in 1989 and won the Eddie James Memorial Trophy that same year. Taylor played college football at the University of Cincinnati.

References

Bio

1964 births
Living people
Players of American football from Los Angeles
American players of Canadian football
Canadian football running backs
BC Lions players
Edmonton Elks players
Cincinnati Bearcats football players
American football running backs
Players of Canadian football from Los Angeles